Oncidium citrinum is a species of orchid found from Colombia to Trinidad.

citrinum